ANSWER, released on February 25, 2009 is Angela Aki's 3rd Japanese studio album. It sold 74,068 copies in its first week, peaking at Number 1 on the Oricon charts. It includes a re-recording of We're All Alone, a song that she had previously covered on One. This marks the second time Angela has re-recorded a song from that 2005 Indie album for inclusion on a major label release. It was released in two editions – the regular Cd edition, and a limited first-press only edition which includes a DVD.

Track listing

Charts (Japan)

Release history

References 

2009 albums
Angela Aki albums
Sony Music Entertainment Japan albums